|}

The Ripon Champion Two Years Old Trophy is a Listed flat horse race in Great Britain open to horses aged two years. It is run at Ripon over a distance of 6 furlongs (1,207 metres), and it is scheduled to take place each year in August.

Winners since 1988

See also
 Horse racing in Great Britain
 List of British flat horse races
UK Horse Racing

References
 Racing Post:

Flat races in Great Britain
Ripon Racecourse
Flat horse races for two-year-olds